Cumulative extremism is a form of political extremism that occurs when one form of political extremism mobilises against another form of political extremism, which was coined by British scholar Roger Eatwell. Eatwell defines cumulative extremism as: 'the way in which one form of extremism can feed off and magnify other forms'. Dr Mohammed Ilyas defines cumulative extremism as 'a process through which different forms of ‘extremism’ interact and can potentially produce a spiral of violence'. The academic Matthew Goodwin gives the example of far-right political organisations mobilising in response to the perceived threat of Islamic extremism.

See also 
 Creeping normality
 Cycle of violence
 Slippery slope
 Violence begets violence
 Virtuous circle and vicious circle

References

Far-right politics
Political spectrum
Extremism